HMS Echo was an E-class destroyer of the British Royal Navy that saw service in the Atlantic, Arctic and Mediterranean theatres during World War II, before being transferred to the Royal Hellenic Navy in 1944, and renamed Navarinon, until scrapped in 1956.

Description
The E-class ships were slightly improved versions of the preceding D class. They were powered by two Parsons geared steam turbines, each driving one propeller shaft, using steam provided by three Admiralty three-drum boilers. The ships' complement was 145 officers and ratings.

The ships mounted four 4.7-inch (120 mm) Mark IX guns in single mounts. For anti-aircraft (AA) defence, they had two quadruple Mark I mounts for the 0.5 inch Vickers Mark III machine gun. The E class was fitted with two above-water quadruple torpedo tube mounts for  torpedoes. One depth charge rail and two throwers were fitted; 20 depth charges were originally carried, but this increased to 35 shortly after the war began.

Service history
Echo had a small role in the film Q Planes, released in March 1939.

In January 1940 Echo was deployed with the 12th Flotilla at Scapa Flow for minelayer escort and patrol duties. In May she was deployed to support military operations in Norway. In August she escorted ships of the 1st Minelaying Squadron on several operations, and on the 28th was detached for duty with the Free French expedition to Dakar (Operation Menace). After the operation was abandoned on 25 September, she escorted the damaged battleship  to Freetown, where Echo was retained for local convoy defence, not rejoining the Flotilla until the end of October.

On 25 May, the day after the Battle of the Denmark Strait, Echo escorted the damaged Prince of Wales to Iceland. From mid-August she was refitted at the Harland and Wolff shipyard at North Woolwich, rejoining the Flotilla on 4 November.

From 8 December, she and  provided the screen for the cruiser  escorting the Russian Convoy PQ 6 to Kola Inlet. On arrival on the 19th, Echo was detached to escort a Russian merchant ship to Murmansk. She was attacked by two German Ju 88 bombers, but spared by the timely arrival of Russian Hurricane fighters and Edinburgh. She then escorted the return Convoy QP 4, arriving back at Scapa Flow on 10 January 1942.

Echo returned to Scapa Flow to provide anti-submarine defence for convoys between the UK and Iceland. On mid-June she began a refit in a Humber shipyard, returning to Scapa Flow on 22 August to join the 8th Destroyer Flotilla. On 2 September she was deployed to support Russian Convoy PQ 18. Further Arctic convoy duty followed, escorting returning Convoy QP 15 in November, then Convoy JW 51A in December 1942, and Convoy JW 52 in January 1943.

In February Echo began a refit at a Humber shipyard, rejoining the 8th Destroyer Flotilla in June, and sailing for Gibraltar on 17 June. In early July the Flotilla sailed to Alexandria to prepare for Operation Husky – the Allied invasion of Sicily.
On arrival on 16 September she was immediately re-deployed to support operations to reoccupy islands in the Aegean. The next day she and  attacked the German Unterseebootsjager UJ-2104 off Stampalia, which was beached and abandoned by her crew.

Greek Service

In 1944 she was transferred to Greece and renamed Navarinon. In June 1953 she was one of a number of foreign ships to attend Queen Elizabeth II's Coronation Review at Spithead.

Notes

Bibliography
 
 
 
 
 
 

 

E and F-class destroyers of the Royal Navy
Ships built on the River Clyde
1934 ships
World War II destroyers of the United Kingdom
E-class destroyers of the Hellenic Navy
World War II destroyers of Greece